Agostino Camigliano (born 11 July 1994) is an Italian footballer who plays for  club Ancona as a central defender.

Club career
Born in Segrate, Camigliano started youth career with Brescia, and after a loan stint with Seregno he was promoted to the first team ahead of 2013–14 season.

On 16 September 2013 Camigliano played his first match as a professional, coming on as a second-half substitute in a 2–1 win at Ternana.

On 30 January 2014 Camigliano joined Udinese for a €1 million cash plus half of the registration rights of Daniele Mori, but Camigliano remained at Brescia on loan until June.

On 27 July 2016 he was signed by Juve Stabia on another loan.

On 31 January 2018 he was signed by Cosenza on loan until June 2018.

On 9 July 2021, he joined Reggiana on a two-year contract.

On 1 September 2022, Camigliano returned to Cosenza.

On 10 January 2023, Camigliano signed a 2.5-year contract with Ancona.

References

External links
Brescia official profile 

1994 births
Living people
People from Segrate
Sportspeople from the Metropolitan City of Milan
Footballers from Lombardy
Association football defenders
Italy youth international footballers
Italian footballers
Brescia Calcio players
U.S. 1913 Seregno Calcio players
Udinese Calcio players
Virtus Entella players
A.S. Cittadella players
Trapani Calcio players
S.S. Juve Stabia players
Cosenza Calcio players
A.C. Reggiana 1919 players
U.S. Ancona 1905 players
Serie B players
Serie C players
Serie D players